The Aurora Plastics Corporation introduced the A/FX (Aurora Factory Experimentals, later simply "AFX") line of slot cars, slot car track sets, and related accessories in 1971. The AFX brand continued production until the company was forced into receivership in 1983. Aurora designed the AFX cars with interchangeable car body shells usually compatible with each chassis they released during these years.  The original 1971 A/FX chassis utilized an updated version of the existing pancake motor design of Aurora's "Thunderjet 500" line, popular in the 1960s. Aurora then released a longer version of the A/FX chassis in 1973, known as the "Specialty" chassis, which incorporated a longer wheelbase and gearplate (and often a more powerful armature) with bodies unique to that chassis. The car bodies designed to fit the shorter original chassis featured a clever snap-on design while the bodies for the Specialty chassis were affixed with a small screw. 
In 1974, Aurora redesigned both the original and Specialty chassis and exposed the bottom of the motor magnets. The exposed magnets were attracted to the metal rails in the track during racing, creating downforce to help hold the car on the track while cornering. AFX "Magna-Traction" cars remained popular from their release in 1974 throughout 1983, even after faster chassis designs were introduced in house and by Tyco.

Aurora introduced the innovative "G-Plus" in-line motor chassis in 1976. This design allowed the manufacture of narrow, open wheel Formula 1 style bodies. A version of the chassis was also released that would fit most of the previous tab-mounted AFX bodies. Aurora never designed an in-line chassis for the longer Specialty chassis bodies. In 1977, Aurora initiated several attempts at AFX-based slotless car chassis designs. These included the Ultra-5, Speed Steer, and Scre-e-echers Magna-Steering. Another in-line chassis design similar to the G-Plus was also introduced as the Super Magna-Traction and SP1000. Trick variants of the Super Magna-Traction include Blazin' Brakes, Speed Shifters and Cats Eyes. Improvements in the form of add-ons to the still popular Magna-Traction chassis, the Magna-Sonic sound box and an overhead light flasher for police cars, were also initiated.

AFX body shells encompassed a variety of themes including the Can-Am racing series, NASCAR and Trans-Am series stock cars, Formula 1, Funny Car Drag Racing, sports cars, off-road cars, and street cars, as well as custom designs.

Aurora contracted with race car drivers whose images and endorsements appeared on AFX Slot Car sets. These included Peter Revson, Jackie Stewart, Mario Andretti, A. J. Foyt, and Richard Petty. Revson's untimely death in 1974 forced Aurora to cover his image with a sticker on already produced boxed sets.

Aurora released only one licensed track set in 1982, when they partnered with the popular Fall Guy TV show. A licensed M*A*S*H set and fire engine set were planned for 1983, but Aurora suspended operations prior to release.

List of AFX Slot Car Chassis (1971-1983)

List of AFX Slot Cars (1971-1983)

List of Aurora/AFX Slot Car Sets (1971-1983) 
Note: Vehicles pictured on the set packaging were not necessarrily the vehicles included; exceptions being themed sets such as those featuring police cars, tractor-trailer rigs, lighted cars, or a specific make or style of car.

List of A/FX Parts, Packaging, Track and Car Accessories

See also 
 Aurora Plastics Corporation
 Slot Car

References

External links
 http://www.afx-aurora.com/en/afx-aurora.htm
 Slot Car History 
 Aurora/AFX International Markets
 http://scottsafx.weebly.com/
 http://bernardsslotcarmuseum.com
 http://www.trackhobbies.com/AFX.html

Slot car brands
Slot car manufacturers
1983 disestablishments